Sökarna: Återkomsten (The Searchers: The Return) is a Swedish crime thriller from 2006. It was directed by Liam Norberg, Lena Koppel and Swedish rock star Thorsten Flinck. Noomi Rapace appears in the film in small role. The budget was 120.000 Swedish crowns. Much of the cast and crew and the plot of the film where recycled from Blodsbröder.

Plot
Jocke is broken out of prison to help his brother pay a debt to the insane kingpin Zoran. Soon he is dragged into an evil spiral of violence and crime.

Cast
 Liam Norberg as Jocke
 Thorsten Flinck as Zoran
 Ray Jones IV as Ray
 Johanna Sällström as Johanna
 Mats Helin as Matte
 Johan Wahlström as Roman
 Reine Brynolfsson as Father Roger
 Lakke Magnusson as Falk
 Thomas Hedengran as Officer Stig
 Matti Berenett as Sven
 Malou Hansson as Hooker
 Ken Ring as Gangster
 Matti Sarén as Zoran's Hitman
 Leif Andrée as Greasy Cop
 Noomi Rapace as Enforcer
 Tommy Sporrong as Cop
 Stella Stark as Zoran's Girl
 Bojan Westin as Enforcer
 Fabrizio Pollo Fiji
 Peter Söderlund as Bodyguard

References

External links

2006 films
2000s Swedish-language films
2006 crime thriller films
Films directed by Lena Koppel
Swedish crime thriller films
2000s Swedish films